Melina Aslanidou (born Symela Saraslanidou, ; 28 August 1974) is a Greek singer.

Early life 
Melina Aslanidou was born on 28 August 1974 in Stuttgart, West Germany from Greek parents. Later, she moved with her family to Greece and grew up in Paralimni of Giannitsa, Greece.

Career 
From 2000 to 2002 she was a member of the band Oi Apenanti. She released an album with the band, in 2002, titled Mikri Agapi. Since then Aslanidou has been on a solo career. In 2003 she released her debut solo album, called To Perasma. Her second studio album Paihnidi Einai was released in 2005. In 2007, she released a CD single with three songs named "Psila Takounia" which were not included later in any studio album. In 2008 she released a compilation album titled Sto Dromo.

In 2014, she became a coach in the reality show of ANT1, The Voice of Greece.

Discography

Studio albums 
 2002: Mikri Agapi (with Oi Apenanti)
 2003: To Perasma
 2005: Paihnidi Einai
 2014: Melina
 2016: Me Fonazoune Me To Mikro Mou
 2018: Ximeroni Kiriaki

Live albums
 2017: Live with Christos Nikolopoulos

Singles 
 2001: "To Parelthon Thimithika" (with Oi Apenanti)
 2007: "Psila Takounia"
 2010: "Alli Mia Fora" (Digital single only)
 2012: "Den Exo Dieuthinsi"
 2013: "Kalokairi Agkalia Mou"
 2013: "Tetarti Vradi ft.Antonis Remos"
 2014: "Ah Kindineuo!"
 2014: "O Hronos Nika (OST for the movie "Koinos Paranomastis")"
 2015: "Na Me Dikaiologiseis"
 2015: "9 Mines (OST for the TV series "9 Mines")"
 2016: "Prosopiki Epilogi"
 2016: "Mes Sto Spiti De Menei Kaneis"
 2017: "Me fonazoune Me To Mikro Mou (Petros Karras & DJ Piko Remix)"
 2017: "An S' Arnitho Agapi Mou"
 2017: "An S' Arnitho Agapi Mou (Remix)"
 2018: "Den Ipame Tin Teleftea Leksi"
 2019: "Se Poia Thalassa Armenizeis"
 2019: "Eyhi"
 2022: "I Melina Aslanidou Erminevi Giorgo Theofanous" (EP)

Compilations 
 2008: Sto Dromo
 2015: "Best Of" (From Newspaper "Ependisi")
 2016: Osa Eipa

Awards and nominations

Arion Music Awards

External links

References 

1974 births
21st-century Greek women singers
Living people
Singers from Thessaloniki